"Mr. Garrity and the Graves" is an episode of the American anthology television series The Twilight Zone.

Opening narration

Plot
In the year 1890, a traveling peddler named Jared Garrity arrives in the little recently renamed town of Happiness, Arizona, offering to bring the townsfolk's dead back from Boot Hill. Initially, they do not believe him, but, when he appears to resurrect a dead dog struck by a traveler's horse-drawn wagon, they believe him.

After performing the resurrection ritual, Garrity, in seemingly casual conversation, reminds the people about the dead and departed, almost all of whom were murdered: who died having a score to settle with whom and so forth. The townsfolk grow uncomfortable at the thought of facing problems they thought buried with the dead. When one apparent resurrectee is seen approaching town, a man believes him to be his brother whom he himself had shot, so the man bribes Garrity to reverse the ritual and the figure vanishes. Ultimately, everyone in town similarly pays Garrity to not revive their "loved ones. "

Later that night, Garrity and his assistant Ace (who was both wagon driver and "resurrectee") ride away with the money, joking about how they cannot actually bring the dead back to life: they had simply performed a few smoke and mirrors tricks to con the townsfolk and used a dog that was alive the whole time, but simply knew how to play dead.

After they have left the town, the last scene reveals that the dead really are rising from the grave, with one commenting that the peddler underestimates his own ability. One revived person is looking forward to getting back into town to get caught up on his drinking. A revived criminal has unfinished business with the sheriff. A woman named Zelda Gooberman plans to break her husband's arm for what she sees in him. As Garrity continues to ride away from Happiness, Arizona, the final shot shows the deserted Boot Hill cemetery.

Closing narration

Cast
 John Dehner as Jared Garrity 
 J. Pat O'Malley: Mr. Gooberman   
 Stanley Adams as Jensen
 John Mitchum as Ace 
 Percy Helton as Lapham  
 Norman Leavitt as Sheriff Gilchrist 
 Edgar Dearing as First Resurrected Man
 Kate Murtagh as Zelda Gooberman
 Patrick O'Moore as Man 
 John Cliff as Lightning Peterson
 Robert McCord as Townsman In Black Hat
 Cosmo Sardo as Resurrected Man

Production

The story was based on an 1873 incident in Alta, Utah, in which a stranger arrived in the mining town and offered to raise the dead. Initially optimistic, residents reconsidered after reflecting on the potential complications to those who had inherited property, and those who had remarried after their spouses died. They collected $2,500 to persuade the stranger to leave town without following through on his offer. Sportswriter Mike Korologos read about the incident in the American Guide Series, and wrote about it for a 1963 article in The Salt Lake Tribune. The Alta Ski Area reprinted his article the following winter in their newsletter, where Serling read it while visiting the resort.

References and further reading

DeVoe, Bill. (2008). Trivia from The Twilight Zone. Albany, GA: Bear Manor Media. 
Grams, Martin. (2008). The Twilight Zone: Unlocking the Door to a Television Classic. Churchville, MD: OTR Publishing.

External links
The Rod Serling Archives at Ithaca College, The Twilight Zone, Season 5, Script 152, "Mr. Garrity and the Graves" 

1964 American television episodes
The Twilight Zone (1959 TV series season 5) episodes
Television episodes written by Rod Serling
Fiction set in 1890
Television episodes directed by Ted Post